Smoking in Korea can refer to:

Smoking in North Korea
Smoking in South Korea

Korea
Health in Korea
Society of Korea